Galactic Tick Day is an awareness and education day that celebrates the movement of the Solar System around the Milky Way galaxy.

The day occurs at a regular interval of 1.7361 years (or 633.7 days), which is called a galactic tick. The interval is derived from one centi-arcsecond of a galactic year, which is the Solar System's roughly 225-million-year trip around the Galactic Center. One galactic tick is only about 0.00000077 percent (1/[360 × 60 × 60 × 100]) of a full galactic year.

Occurrences
The first Galactic Tick Day took place one galactic tick after Hans Lippershey filed the patent for the telescope on 2 October, 1608. The first observance of the holiday was on 29 September 2016, the 235th Galactic Tick Day. Below is a list of further observances:

See also 
 Astronomical chronology
 Chronology
 Cosmic Calendar

References

External links 

 Galactic Tick website
 IFLScience.com article about Galactic Tick Day
 Disquiet Junto Project 0248: Galactic Tick musical compositions on SoundCloud
 GalacticTick on GitHub

Awareness days
Observances about science
Unofficial observances
Milky Way